Sanctipaulus mendesi is a species of fossil caddisfly, known from a single specimen. It was found in the Geopark of Paleorrota in Santa Maria Formation in rocks dating from the Triassic. It was found in 1955 in a shipment made by Irajá Damiani Pinto.

Morphology 
The specimen consists of only one wing. It was initially classified as Derbidae (Auchenorrhyncha), but was subsequently reclassified.

References

Martins-Neto, Rafael Gioia; Gallego, Oscar Florencio and Melchor, Ricardo Nestor. The Triassic insect fauna from South America (Argentina, Brazil and Chile): a checklist (except Blattoptera and Coleoptera) and descriptions of new taxa. Acta Zoologica Cracoviensia, 46(suppl.– Fossil Insects): 229–256, Kraków, 15 Oct., 2003
 Jacek Szwedo. First fossil record of Cedusini in the Eocene Baltic amber with notes on the tribe (Hemiptera: Fulgoromorpha: Derbidae). Russian Entomological Journal 15(3): 327–333, 2006.

Trichoptera
Triassic insects
Triassic animals of South America
Fossil taxa described in 1956